Shocking Blue is a 2010 Dutch drama film. Directed by Mark de Cloe, the movie stars Lisa Smit, Dragan Bakema, and Niels Gomperts. It was screened at the 2010 Seattle International Film Festival, the São Paulo International Film Festival, the Cairo Panorama of the European Film and the Seville European Film Festival. It received two Golden Calf nominations for Best Supporting Actor (Niels Gomperts) and best cinematography (Rob Hodselmans).

Plot
Thomas, Jacques and Chris, all about sixteen years, are best friends. They live in the Dutch bulb-growing region, where villages, fields and meadows lean against the dunes and beach. Their lives are like so many rural youth, but a dramatic accident changed everything. When the three of them are sitting on the tractor, Jacques falls below it, while Thomas steers the wheel. Thomas asks himself in the depths of his thoughts if his jealousy of Jacques, who ran off with Manou the evening before, had something to do with the accident.

Cast
 Lisa Smit - Manou
  - Jaques
  - Wojtek
  - Femke
  - Vader Thomas en Chantal
Jim van der Panne - Chris
Ruben van Weelden - Thomas

References

External links

2010 films
Dutch drama films
2010s Dutch-language films
2010 drama films